Datuk Billy Abit Joo (born 10 May 1949) was the Member of the Parliament of Malaysia for the Hulu Rajang constituency in Sarawak from 1990 to 2013.

Billy Abit entered Parliament in the 1990 election, running as an independent. He later joined the Sarawak People's Party (PRS) in the Barisan Nasional coalition. His rural constituency was the largest by area in Malaysia. In 2009, he led a parliamentary delegation into the constituency to enquire into living conditions of the Penan people. He has called for the establishment of forest reserves for the Penans. In 2008, he crossed party lines to be the only government MP to sign a petition for the review of Malaysia's Internal Security Act.

Billy Abit's parliamentary career came to an end at the 2013 election, when the PRS nominated Wilson Ugak Kumbong to contest Hulu Rajang.

Election results

References

Living people
1949 births
People from Sarawak
Members of the Dewan Rakyat
Parti Rakyat Sarawak politicians
Independent politicians in Malaysia